Boom Sport One was a Romanian sports channel which was available only via DTH platform Boom TV. The channel had the broadcast rights for:

UEFA Champions League
NBA
KHL
Liga Sagres

Boom Sport One has been bought by Romtelecom Dolce and renamed DolceSport.

External links
Boom Sport One
Boom Sport One at LyngSat Address

Boom TV (Romania)
Sports television networks
Defunct television channels in Romania
2006 establishments in Romania
2010 disestablishments in Romania
Television channels and stations established in 2006
Television channels and stations disestablished in 2010